Joyful Noise: Poems for Two Voices is a book of poetry for children by Paul Fleischman. It won the 1989 Newbery Medal.

The book is a collection of fourteen children's poems about insects such as mayflies, lice, and honeybees. The concept is unusual in that the poems are  intended to be read aloud by two people. Some lines are spoken by the readers simultaneously, while others are read alternately by the speakers.

Kirkus Reviews called Joyful Noise "A splendid collection of poems in many moods about the lives and dreams of insects."

References

1988 children's books
1988 poetry books
American children's books
American poetry collections
Newbery Medal–winning works
Children's poetry books
Harper & Row books
Insects in culture